Ian Winchester (born 27 May 1973) is a discus thrower from New Zealand.

He finished tenth at the 1992 World Junior Championships, eighth at the 1998 World Cup and fifth at the 1998 Commonwealth Games (where he also finished eighth in shot put) He also competed at two World Championships (1997, 1999) as well as the 2000 Summer Olympics without reaching the final round.

His personal best throw is 65.03 metres, achieved in May 2002 in Salinas. This is the current national record, and makes him the third best discus thrower in Oceania after Australians Werner Reiterer and Wayne Martin.

Achievements

Personal bests

References

1973 births
Living people
New Zealand male discus throwers
Athletes (track and field) at the 2000 Summer Olympics
Olympic athletes of New Zealand
Athletes (track and field) at the 1998 Commonwealth Games
Commonwealth Games competitors for New Zealand
New Zealand male shot putters